William Hilliard (1778–1836) was a publisher and bookseller in Boston and Cambridge, Massachusetts, in the early 19th-century. He worked with several business partners through the years, including Jacob Abbot Cummings, James Brown, and Charles C. Little. President Thomas Jefferson selected his firm to supply approximately 7,000 volumes on numerous topics in 1825-1826, to create the University of Virginia Library.

Biography

Hilliard married, and he and his wife had the following children: Foster (1814-1817), James Winthrop (1816-1817), and Francis Hilliard (ca.1808-1878)

Bookselling and publishing
Hilliard's several bookselling and publishing firms in Boston and Cambridge included:
 Cummings & Hilliard (1812-1820), Boston; with Jacob Abbot Cummings
 Hilliard and Metcalf (ca.1817-1824), Cambridge; with Eliab Wight Metcalf 
 Cummings, Hilliard & Co. (ca.1820-1825), Boston; with Timothy H. Carter
 Hilliard, Gray & Co. (1827), with Harrison Gray
 Hilliard, Gray, Little and Wilkins (ca.1826-1827), with Harrison Gray, Charles C. Little, John H. Wilkins
 Hilliard & Brown, Cambridge (ca.1828), with Charles Brown
 Hilliard, Gray & Co. (ca.1832), Washington St., Boston; with Harrison Gray, J.H. Wilkins, James Brown

Jefferson & University of Virginia Library

In 1825-1826, Cummings, Hilliard & Co. supplied Thomas Jefferson with books for his new library at the University of Virginia. 

Jefferson felt the need for an American agent, one who would not only supply books for the Library but who would also set up near the University a bookstore for handling texts to be used by the students. The Boston firm of Cummings,  Hilliard  and Company was selected, the sum of $18,000 was placed to its credit, and Jefferson undertook to supply a complete list of desirable volumes covering all fields of learning. By June 1825 this list, of nearly 7,000 volumes, had been laboriously completed. ... The purchases made through Cummings,  Hilliard  and Company began to arrive during the winter of 1825–1826.

A few weeks after Jefferson's death in July 1826, William Hilliard 

... with whom there had been much correspondence but whom Jefferson had never met, journeyed to Charlottesville and unpacked and checked the books which had been temporarily stored in the pavilion on West Lawn. 

The volumes were shelved in the Rotunda, "the general library of the University of Virginia from 1826 to 1938."

See also
 List of booksellers in Boston

References

Further reading

Works by Hilliard
 An address delivered before the Massachusetts Charitable Mechanic Association, October 4, 1827 : being the anniversary for the choice of officers, and the seventh triennial celebration of their public festival. Cambridge [Mass.] : Printed by Hilliard, Metcalf, and Co., 1827.
 Address delivered at the annual visitation of Amicable Lodge, in Cambridge, Massachusetts : November 16, 1829. Cambridge [Mass.] : E.W. Metcalf and Co., 1829.
 An Epitome of Modern Geography, with Maps: for the use of common schools, By J.E. Worcester  Boston: Published by Cummings and Hillard, Boston Bookstore, No. 1 Cornhill. 1820

Other works
 Thomas Jefferson; Elizabeth Cometti, editor. Jefferson's ideas on a university library : letters from the founder of the University of Virginia to a Boston bookseller. Charlottesville : Tracy W. McGregor Library, University of Virginia, 1950. (Letters from Jefferson to William Hilliard and to Cummings, Hilliard and Co., Boston, ca.1825-1826).

1778 births
1836 deaths
19th century in Boston
American publishers (people)
Businesspeople from Boston
History of Cambridge, Massachusetts